Plătărești is a commune in Călărași County, Muntenia, Romania. It is composed of four villages: Cucuieți, Dorobanțu, Plătărești, and Podu Pitarului.

The commune is located in the southwestern reaches of the Bărăgan Plain, in the western part of the county.

At the 2011 census, Plătărești had a population of 4,178. Of those, 88.61% were ethnic Romanians and 4.14% Roma.

Plătărești Monastery was built in 1632–1646 by Voivode Matei Basarab.

Natives
 Mihail Dragomirescu

References

Communes in Călărași County
Localities in Muntenia